Kaylee Marie Kaneshiro Bryant (born November 1, 1997) is an American actress and model. She is known for portraying Josie Saltzman on The CW television series, Legacies, a role she played from 2018 to 2021.

Biography 
Bryant grew up in Southern California. Due to her early career in modeling and acting, she was homeschooled for part of her upbringing and entered junior year in high school at the age of 15 years old. Bryant is of Japanese descent through her grandfather who is from Okinawa, and spoke Japanese whilst growing up.
Bryant publicly came out as queer in June 2021.

Career 
Bryant began her career as a model when she was 7 years old for clothing brands like Ralph Lauren walking runways and doing print ads. She eventually transitioned into acting when she was 8 years old and participated in children's theater. She went to appear on shows like American Horror Story, Santa Clarita Diet, The Real O'Neals, and Kickin' It among others. Her first lead role was in the 2014 independent film in Mary Loss of Soul. 

In 2018, Bryant was cast in The CW's supernatural drama series Legacies as Josie Saltzman, one of the series' starring roles, a role she portrayed on the show through its fourth season. In 2021, she was cast in the thriller film The Locksmith.

Filmography

References

External links 
 

21st-century American actresses
American actresses of Japanese descent
Living people
American television actresses
American people of Okinawan descent
Actresses from California
1997 births
American queer actresses
American LGBT people of Asian descent